Belleair may refer to several places in Pinellas County, Florida, United States:

Belleair, Florida
Belleair Beach, Florida
Belleair Bluffs, Florida 
Belleair Shore, Florida

See also
Bel Air (disambiguation)
Bel-Aire (disambiguation)
Belair (disambiguation)
Bellaire (disambiguation)